Edward Jancarz Stadium is a 15,000-capacity multi-use stadium in Gorzów Wielkopolski, Poland, and the home of motorcycle speedway club Stal Gorzów Wielkopolski. It is currently used mostly as a 329 m racetrack for speedway matches and is the home stadium of Stal Gorzów Wielkopolski in the Speedway Ekstraliga. The stadium has opened in 1951.

It is named after Edward Jancarz, a former speedway rider from Gorzów Wielkopolski who finished third in the 1968 World Final in Sweden, and helped Poland win the 1969 Speedway World Team Cup at home in Rybnik. Jancarz was murdered by his wife in 1992.

Hosted

International 
 Speedway Grand Prix: 2011, 2012, 2013, 2014, 2015
 Speedway World Cup: 2010 (Event One), 2011 (Race-off and the Final)
 Individual Speedway Junior World Championship: 2000 Final
 Team Speedway Junior World Championship: 2009 Final

Polish Championships 
 Individual Speedway Polish Championship Finals: 1970, 1974, 1976, 1977, 1978, 1979, 1984, 1985,
 Polish Pairs Speedway Championship Finals: 1982, 1992, 1998

See also 
 Speedway in Poland
 Stal Gorzów Wielkopolski

References

Speedway venues in Poland
Sport in Gorzów Wielkopolski
Buildings and structures in Gorzów Wielkopolski
Sports venues in Lubusz Voivodeship
1951 establishments in Poland
Sports venues completed in 1951